Guyj Ali Tappeh (also Romanized as Gūyj ‘Alī Tappeh ; also known as Gūyjeh ‘Alī Tappeh and Gūyjehlarī Tappeh) is a village in Bash Qaleh Rural District, in the Central District of Urmia County, West Azerbaijan Province, Iran. At the 2006 census, its population was 27, in 6 families.

References 

Populated places in Urmia County